Chandramukhi is a 2005 Indian Tamil-language comedy horror film written and directed by P. Vasu. An official remake of the Malayalam film Manichitrathazhu (1993), the film stars Rajinikanth, Prabhu, Jyothika, Nayanthara and Vadivelu with an ensemble supporting cast. It revolves around a woman, who suffers from dissociative identity disorder that affects a family, and a psychiatrist who intends to solve the case while risking his life.

Chandramukhi was produced by Prabhu and his brother Ramkumar Ganesan through their company Sivaji Productions, and is the company's 50th film. The soundtrack album and background score were composed by Vidyasagar. Cinematography was handled by Sekhar V. Joseph and editing was done by Suresh Urs. Principal photography began on 24 October 2004 and was completed in March 2005. The film was made on a budget of 19 crores.

Chandramukhi was released on 14 April 2005 on the eve of the Tamil New Year. The film became a major box office success, with a theatrical run of 890 days at Shanti Theatre. The film won five Tamil Nadu State Film Awards, four Film Fans' Association Awards and two Filmfare Awards. Jyothika and Vadivelu were each awarded a Kalaimamani Award for their work on the film. A sequel entered production in 2022.

Plot 
Saravanan, a psychiatrist from the United States, comes to meet his friend Senthilnathan, and his wife Ganga while on vacation. Senthil's mother Kasthuri wanted Senthil to marry Priya, the daughter of his father's cousin Kandaswamy, to reunite the two branches of the family after 30 years of separation because Senthil's father chose to marry Kasthuri instead of Kandaswamy's sister, Akhilandeshwari, who is also his cousin. Saravanan learns that Senthil had bought the Vettaiyapuram mansion, despite attempts by the local village elders to dissuade them, and moves in with them. Akhilandeshwari is jealous of Saravanan and plots to kill him with the help of her assistant Oomaiyan.

When the family visits their ancestral temple, the chief priest reveals the reason everyone fears the mansion. Around 150 years ago, a king named Vettaiyan travelled to Vizianagaram in Andhra Pradesh, where he met and fell in love with a dancer named Chandramukhi. However, she did not reciprocate his feelings as she was already in love with another dancer named Gunasekaran. As a result, Vettaiyan took her back to his palace by force. Unknown to him, Chandramukhi made Gunasekaran stay in a house opposite and met him secretly. When Vettaiyan discovered this, he beheaded Gunasekaran on Durgashtami and burnt Chandramukhi alive. As a result, Chandramukhi's ghost tried to take revenge on Vettaiyan, who with the help of various priests and sorcerers from all over the country, tamed the ghost by locking it in an urn, which is kept at the shelf up in a room located in the palace's south-west corner which is guarded by a king cobra. Vettaiyan too died after a few days. Priya is in love with Vishwanathan, a dance professor who reciprocates her feelings. Their love is supported by Saravanan, who requests Kandaswamy to arrange their marriage.

After hearing Chandramukhi's story, Ganga, who thinks that the story was fabricated to keep thieves from stealing treasures in the room, wishes to go there. Saravanan receives an email to attend a patient and assures Senthil to call him if anything happens before leaving. Ganga gets the duplicate room key from the gardener's granddaughter Durga and opens the door to the room. Subsequently, strange things begin to happen in the household: a ghost frightens the people in the house, things inexplicably break, and Ganga's sari catches fire. Suspicion turns towards Durga. Senthil immediately calls Saravanan to solve the case. As soon as Saravanan returns, a mysterious being tries to kill Priya. Saravanan also investigates other incidents such as the attempts to kill Senthil are made with poisoning his coffee and by pushing a glass fish tank to fall on his head. Also another mysterious happening is the sound of someone singing and dancing coming from Chandramukhi's room during the night.

Ganga mysteriously disappears during Priya and Viswanathan's engagement. Saravanan notices her absence and searches for her, but is attacked by Oomaiyanwho has been sent by Akhilandeshwari. Saravanan subdues Oomaiyan and with Senthil's help finds Ganga, who is supposedly being sexually harassed by Viswanathan. Saravanan reveals to Senthil and Viswanathan that Ganga suffers from split personality disorder, following the death of her parents. He also reveals that she heard stories from her grandmother, which worsened her disorder. Ganga's mischievous behaviour made her enter into Chandramukhi's room and Chandramukhi possessed her after the urn fell down and broke while she was cleaning the room. Saravanan tells them that Ganga who turned into Chandramukhi tried to kill Priya and Senthil, as they are the only obstacles and that the former was Viswanathan's fiancee and the latter was Ganga's husband. She framed Viswanathan for sexual harassment, as she thinks that Viswanathan is her lover Gunasekaran since he stays at the same place Gunasekaran did. By framing Vishwanathan and also framing Durga via possession, Chandramukhi planned to stop the engagement. The only way to stop Chandramukhi is to make her believe she killed Vettaiyan on Durgashtami since Saravanan impersonated Vettaiyan and disrupted one of the pujas conducted by the exorcist Ramachandra Acharya by conversing with Chandramukhi to know its wish. Before carrying out his plan, Saravanan asks Senthil to trigger Ganga to see for himself whether she turns into Chandramukhi or not. When Senthil does so, she turns into Chandramukhi, which shocks him. A worried Senthil shouts at Ganga, turning her back to normal.

Akhilandeshwari overhears Saravanan's idea of self-sacrifice and apologises to him. On Durgashtami, in the dance hall, the family and Ramachandra Acharya allow Chandramukhi to burn Saravanan alive. Ramachandra Acharya then blows smoke and ash on Ganga's face when she is given a torch to burn Saravanan. Senthil then opens a trapdoor to let Saravanan escape, and an effigy of Vettaiyan gets burnt instead. Convinced that Vettaiyan is dead, Chandramukhi leaves Ganga's body, curing her. The two families are reunited after 30 years, Saravanan and Durga fall in love, and the couple Swarna and Murugesan become parents after eight years of marriage.

Cast 

 Rajinikanth as Dr. Saravanan / Vettaiyan Raja
 Jyothika as Ganga Senthilnathan / Chandramukhi
 Prabhu as Senthilnathan
 Vadivelu as Murugesan
 Nayanthara as Durga
 Nassar as Kandaswamy
 Vineeth as Viswanathan / Gunasekaran
 Vijayakumar as Durga's grandfather
 Sheela as Akhilandeswari
 K. R. Vijaya as Kasthuri
 Avinash as Ramachandra Acharya
 Suvarna Mathew as Swarna Murugesan
 Malavika as Priya Viswanathan
 Vinaya Prasad as Lakshmi Kandaswamy
 Manobala as a fake exorcist
 Sonu Sood as Oomaiyan
 Thyagu as Kumar
 Mohan Raj as Nair
 Madhan Bob as a car owner
 T. P. Gajendran as Senthilnathan's assistant
 Sudha Rani as Ganga's mother
 Sujibala as Kandaswamy's youngest daughter
 Unnikrishnan Namboothiri as the temple priest (uncredited)
 Sivaji Ganesan as Senthilnathan's father (uncredited, only shown in photo)
 Praharshitha as Bommi

Director P. Vasu, producer Ramkumar Ganesan and Raj Bahaddur make guest appearances in the song "Devuda Devuda".

Production

Development 

During the success meet of Mannan (1992), Rajinikanth announced that he would act in Sivaji Productions' 50th film, which would eventually become Chandramukhi. In September 2004, Rajinikanth congratulated P. Vasu on the success of his Kannada film Apthamitra (2004) and was impressed with the film's screenplay. Vasu then requested to remake the film in Tamil with Rajinikanth, who in turn, called Ramkumar Ganesan and asked him to produce it under Ramkumar's banner, Sivaji Productions.

Ramkumar telephoned Vasu, who was offering worship in a temple in Guruvayur at that time, informing him of Rajinikanth's wish to do Apthamitra in Tamil under his direction. Vasu reworked the script he wrote for Apthamitra to suit Rajinikanth's style of acting. The film dealt mainly with the concept of dissociative identity disorder, commonly known as "multiple personality disorder" (MPD) or "split personality disorder". Another film titled Anniyan (2005), which was released two months after Chandramukhi, was also based on the same disorder.

Thota Tharani was the film's art director, and also designed the costumes. Regarding the designing of the Vettaiyapuram palace, he watched both Apthamitra and its source Malayalam film Manichitrathazhu (1993) to get the basic idea of the film's plot. Vasu wanted Tharani to make the sets more colourful and grand and did not want the realistic look of the original film. Tharani designed Chandramukhi's room and placed a corridor in it, which was quite different from the original and its Kannada remake. The corridor resembled those commonly seen in palaces in Kerala. Sidney Sladen did additional costume designing in the film.

Casting 

Rajinikanth played the roles of Dr. Saravanan and King Vettaiyan. He sported a wig for his role. Both Rajinikanth and P. Vasu discussed every scene featuring the former and added necessary inputs before they were shot. Rajinikanth appears in the beginning of the film unlike Manichitrathazhu, where the same character, played by Mohanlal, appears in the middle of the film. Rajinikanth requested Vasu to change the dancer's name from Nagavalli, which was the name of the danseuse in Apthamithra, to Chandramukhi since the latter sounded more royal. While Vishnuvardhan uttered "Haula Haula" in the original, Rajinikanth used "Lakka Lakka", which was based on the mannerisms of a villain in a Marathi play Rajinikanth watched in his childhood days. Ramkumar's brother Prabhu played Senthilnathan, a civil engineer and owner of Ganesh Constructions. Prabhu co-produced the film with Ramkumar.

For the roles of Ganga and Chandramukhi, Soundarya was initially selected to reprise her role from Apthamithra, but her death led the director to choose Simran and he shaped the character to suit her. In November 2004, Simran refused to do the project, as her role required a lot of dancing and cited her pregnancy at that time as another main reason for her refusal. Aishwarya Rai was offered the role but she declined the offer due to schedule conflicts. Sadha, Asin, and Reema Sen were also considered as replacements. The role finally went to Jyothika, who allotted 50 days of her schedule. Vasu wanted her to perform her scenes in a manner different from that of Shobana in Manichitrathazhu, enacting the scenes himself before they were shot featuring Jyothika. Nayanthara was selected to portray the role of Durga after Vasu was impressed with her performance in the Malayalam film Manassinakkare (2003).

Vadivelu portrayed the comic role of Murugesan. Rajinikanth, at the film's 200th day theatrical run celebration function, said that it was he who recommended Vadivelu to Vasu for the role and had asked Ramkumar to get Vadivelu's dates before planning the filming schedules. Sheela played Akhilandeswari, the intimidating older sister of Kandaswamy (Nassar) and Murugesan. When Sheela was signed on for the role, she was requested by the producers not to divulge details about her role to the media.

Filming 

Principal photography commenced on 24 October 2004 with a puja ceremony for the muhurat shot at Annai Illam, the residence of Sivaji Ganesan. Ramkumar Ganesan said the filming would be finished by 15 February 2005, giving the crew two months to complete the post-production work, including visual effects. The first shooting schedule began two days later with a fight scene choreographed by Thalapathy Dinesh and filmed at Ramavaram in Chennai. More than 25 Toyota Qualis and 30 stunt artists were involved in the fight sequence that featured Rajinikanth. The Vettaiyapuram mansion was erected in Hyderabad. The song sequences, one picturised on Rajini alone, two songs in which he appears with the other principal cast members, and the climax song, which was picturised on Jyothika, were filmed in Ramoji Film City. Vasu said the film had taken only 78 days to be completed instead of the planned 120 days.

The picturisation of the song "Devuda Devuda" focused on a variety of professions, especially janitors, sewage cleaners, farmers and washer folk. According to Ramji, who helped the production unit look for locations for the song "Konjam Neram", Australia and Russia were the initial choices for filming locations for the song sequence, but Ramkumar Ganesan and Vasu chose Turkey, making Chandramukhi the first Tamil film to be shot there. The production unit flew to Istanbul from Chennai via Dubai on 25 February 2005. The filming of the song was completed after the audio launch. "Konjam Neram" was shot in segments in Ephesus and Pamukkale. Shooting in Ephesus took six hours. The segment in Pamukkale was filmed in an amphitheatre in the ancient city of Hierapolis, which is located close to Pamukkale. The last segment was shot in the Cappadocia region, a 10-hour drive by bus from Istanbul. "Raa Raa" was choreographed by Kala and took four days to be completed instead of the planned seven days.

Music 

Vidyasagar composed the soundtrack album and the background score of Chandramukhi. The soundtrack album consists of six tracks. Vaali, Yugabharathi, Pa. Vijay, Na. Muthukumar and Bhuvana Chandra wrote the lyrics. The track "Raa Raa" was based on the Surya raaga, which is also known as the Sallabham raaga. Asha Bhosle was engaged to sing a song for the film and to attend the film's audio launch. The audio rights for the film were sold to Sanjay Wadhwa of AnAK audio, later known as AP International for 11 million. Tata Indicom and Sunfeast Biscuits were the sponsors for the audio launch and marketing.

The album was released on 5 March 2005 at the Taj Connemara hotel in Chennai. An overseas audio launch took place the next day in Malaysia. At the Music World shop in Chennai, 437 cassettes and 227 compact discs were sold on the first day of its stock release. The cassettes were priced at 45 each and CD's at 99 each. The original soundtrack of the film and a video CD titled "The making of Chandramukhi", were released on 27 September 2005 in Chennai. The film's background score was released as a separate album.

The album received positive reviews from critics. Siddhu Warrier of Rediff said that "Devuda Devuda" "finds S. P. Balasubramanian in top form". He called "Konjam Neram" "melodious in a forgettable kind of way", "Athinthom" a "soft, melodious song", "Kokku Para Para" as "insipid", "Raa Raa" "a rather listenable track", and said "Annonda Pattu" is "vintage Rajni, and gets your feet tapping. One can almost picture Rajni brandishing his trademark cigarette and sunglasses as he gyrates to the beat. If one is a die-hard Rajni fan, then one is likely to go  dancing to this." Singer Charulatha Mani, writing for The Hindu called the song "Konjam Neram", which was based on the Sriranjani raga, an "attractive take on the raga" and said the song "is contemporary in feel and traditional at the roots".

Release 
The film was released on 14 April 2005, a Tamil New Year's Day release, alongside Kamal Haasan-starrer Mumbai Xpress and Vijay-starrer Sachein. Chandramukhi was released in 37 theatres in Malaysia, 15 in Europe, nine in Sri Lanka, seven in the United States, four each in Canada and the Persian Gulf countries and two each in Australia and Singapore. The film was released with 23 prints in Coimbatore, 12 more than Rajinikanth's Padayappa (1999).

Chandramukhi was screened at the 18th Tokyo International Film Festival in Japan on 23 October 2005 and 28 October 2005 as part of the 'Winds of Asia' section. It was the first public screening of the film in Japan. It was met with positive response from audiences there. The film opened the 7th IIFA Awards Film Festival held at the Dubai International Convention Centre in Dubai, United Arab Emirates, becoming the first South Indian film to open the Film Festival. In November 2011, it was screened at the International Tamil Film Festival held in Uglich, Russia alongside Thillana Mohanambal (1968), Sivaji: The Boss (2007), Angadi Theru (2010), Boss Engira Bhaskaran (2010), Thenmerku Paruvakaatru (2010) and Ko (2011).

Though the film was a remake, Madhu Muttam, who wrote the story for Manichithrathazhu, was not mentioned in either the opening or closing credits. Instead, the story was credited to the director P. Vasu. Vasu defended himself by stating the script was not a scene-by-scene remake of the original and that only the basic plot was used.

Marketing 
The producers entered into a business dealing with Tata Indicom to promote the film; ringtones of the songs from the film's soundtrack and special screensavers were issued. Sunfeast Biscuits also helped in the film's promotion; They launched special merchandise which consists of cards, featuring Rajinikanth and some stills of Chandramukhi. Giant cutouts of Rajinikanth and movie release posters were posted all over the state as a run-up for the release. The promotional campaign started in early March 2005 and continued mid-May that year. The film was screened in eight city theatres in Chennai.

Home media 
The film's original negative was damaged because of poor care and ill treatment. AP International started a restoration project, which scanned the film frame-by-frame in a 2K workflow. They were able to remove all wear and tear and retain the natural film grain. This restored version was released on 2 August 2012 on Blu-ray format. The satellite rights of the film is sold to Sun TV. Its television premiere occurred on the occasion of Diwali in 27 October 2008.

Reception

Critical response 

Writing for The Hindu, Malathi Rangarajan said, "As you watch the film you cannot but admire the ingenuity of writer-director P. Vasu in choosing a story that is bound to sell and at the same time helping Rajini maintain his image of an invincible hero", before concluding that, "The 'Mannan' team proves a winner again". Another critic from The Hindu, Sudhish Kamath, said Rajinikanth is "at his vintage best". A reviewer from The Times of India called the film "Entertaining, stylish, respectful of ritual, and always massively larger than life". Arun Ram of India Today said, "With Chandramukhi, Rajnikant revives his fading career and fortunes of Tamil cinema". G. Ulaganathan, writing for the Deccan Herald praised the chemistry between Rajinikanth and Vadivelu, saying "Rajinikanth is back in full form, comedy comes naturally to him and he finds an able ally in Vadivelu. Some of the best scenes in the movie are when both are together."

Tamil magazine Ananda Vikatan said in its review, "Rajni's films normally revolve around him but in this case, Rajni is in a script which goes around several people ... Rajni as Vettaiyan is the highlight of the film ... After many years, Rajni has shown that he does not confine to his personality cage through this film." and gave the film 40 marks out of 100. The Sify reviewer wrote that Chandramukhi was simply "a remake of P. Vasu's Apthamitra from Kannada with some additional songs, fights and comedy scenes thrown in to further boost the superstar's image" but like Ulaganathan, commended the comedy scenes of Rajinikanth and Vadivelu, terming them the film's highlight. A. Ganesh Nadar of Rediff said the film would become "a certain hit" and,"[t]he star will be happy, his fans will be happy and producer Prabhu will giggle all the way to the bank".

V. Gangadhar of The Tribune wrote, "As in all Rajni films, Chandramukhi is a one-star attraction and Rajni plays to the gallery, There are no political messages in the film and that should come as some relief. With Nayan Tara and Jyotika in the female leads, there is plenty of glamour in the film. But the message is clear, King Rajni is back. His legion of fans can not ask for more." Karthiga Rukmanykanthan writing for Daily News Sri Lanka said, " ... the long anticipated delight Chandramukhi has made itself the box-office hit of the year". Grady Hendrix of Slate appreciated Rajinikanth's characterisation in the film, calling the character, Saravanan's ability to read minds "well-trained" before concluding, "Rajinikanth's movies are crammed with comedy, action, and musical numbers and they take great delight in kicking narrative logic in the face."

Box office 
Chandramukhi was a box office success, selling 20 million tickets worldwide and earning 150 million in salary and profit share for Rajinikanth. The film's distributors made a 20 per cent profit over the 25 million for which they bought the rights to the film. Its 365th day was celebrated at Sivaji Ganesan's family-owned Shanthi Theatre in Chennai; the celebrations were organised by Life Insurance Corporation of India.

The film's 804th day celebration function was held at Kamaraj Arangam in Chennai on 25 June 2007. The then Chief Minister of Tamil Nadu, M. Karunanidhi, director K. Balachander, film producer and owner of AVM Productions M. Saravanan, Kamal Haasan and Sridevi attended the function. Karunanidhi presented the "Shivaji" sword to the film's cast and crew, and awards were given to everyone involved in the film.

India 
Chandramukhi grossed 8.4 million in 11 days in eight screens in Chennai. In the Santham screen of Sathyam Cinemas, around 22,000 tickets were sold for the first 10 days of its release. Chandramukhi grossed 30 million in Coimbatore, beating the 24.5 million record set there by Padayappa. Chandramukhi received 60 million as Minimum Guarantee (MG) from theatres in North Arcot, South Arcot and Chengalpattu districts collectively. It was also a hit in Kerala where it grossed 711,545 in four days, doing better than the Mohanlal starrer Chandrolsavam, which also released on 14 April 2005, but grossed 523,340 during the same period of time.

The film's theatrical run lasted 890 days at Shanthi Theatre, beating the 62-year record set by the 1944 film Haridas, which ran for 784 days at the Broadway theatre, also in Chennai. According to Krishna Gopalan of Business Today, the film grossed 750 million (US$16.6 million in 2005) in its lifetime run. The New Indian Express estimates that it grossed 650 million (US$14.3 million in 2005). It was the longest running South Indian film, until surpassed by the Telugu film Magadheera (2009), which completed a theatrical run of 1000 days in April 2012.

Overseas 
Chandramukhi was screened in Tokyo in October 2005 to packed houses. Chandramukhi completed a 100-day theatrical run in South Africa. It collectively earned 43 million in Malaysia, UAE and the US during the first month of its theatrical run. The film collected 62.78 million (US$1.4 million in 2005) in Malaysia; it was the only Indian film to feature in that country's top ten grossing films of the year.

Accolades 
The awards for the film mainly went to Vadivelu and Jyothika for their performances. Rajinikanth won a Tamil Nadu State Film Awards for their roles. In an interview with The Hindu, Binny Krishnakumar said:

Scientific accuracy 
In an August 2005 seminar on revisiting psychiatric disorders which centred around Chandramukhi and Anniyan, psychiatrist Asokan noted that there were many logical faults in both films; Vasu said he knew nothing about psychiatric disorders. Writing for PopMatters in 2014, Kumuthan Maderya criticised Vasu for confusing "spirit possession with Dissociative Identity Disorder, conflating both to create pop psychology" and "Ostensibly fusing modern science and demonology for the sake of intellectualism".

Legacy 

Split personality disorder became well known after the film's release. MIOT hospital, in a blog description of the syndrome, called it The Chandramukhi syndrome. Film artist, trainer and film-maker L. Satyanand said Chandramukhi is a classic example of the subgenre "horror of the demonic" and of "brilliance", ranking it alongside The Legend of Sleepy Hollow and Psycho (1960). The film became a trendsetter for later horror films such as the Muni series, Yavarum Nalam (2009), Eeram (2009), Pizza (2012), Yaamirukka Bayamey (2014), Aranmanai (2014), Darling (2015) and Demonte Colony (2015).

Sivaji Productions joined Galatta Media and eBay for an online auction of the film's memorabilia, becoming the first South Indian film to auction film merchandise. Ramkumar Ganesan said the proceeds of the auction would be given to the Sivaji Prabhu Charity Trust and that 300,000 (US$6,650 in 2005) would be given to Papanchatram Middle School. Sophie Atphthavel from France bought Rajinikanth's sunglasses, which he sported in the film, for 25,000 (US$554 in 2005). According to Girish Ramdas, chief operating officer of Galatta Media, all the items had certificates of authenticity signed by the film's producers. Bidding for the items ranged between 10,000 (US$222 in 2005) and 20,000 (US$444 in 2005).

In a statement by eBay, the articles made available for bidding were Rajinikanth's blue shirt worn in the song "Devuda Devuda", Jyothika's saree worn for the climax scenes, the peach-coloured saree worn by Nayanthara in the song "Konja Neram", and the Vettaiyan Raja costume and ornaments worn on set by Rajinikanth. Rajinikanth's dress, which he wore in "Devuda Devuda", was sold for 25,000 (US$554 in 2005). His Vettaiyan costume and ornament set were sold for 32,000 (US$709 in 2005). The saree worn by Nayanthara in the song "Kokku Para Para" was also auctioned.

In popular culture 
Some scenes, lines and expressions from the film, such as the "Lakka Lakka..." sound that Rajnikanth's character makes, became very popular, especially with children. Vadivelu's expressions and scenesespecially those with Rajinikanthand lines including "Maapu?...Vachittandaa Aapu!!!" (Dude?...He screwed me up!!!), also became popular. A line spoken by Rajinikanth to Prabhu, Naan gunda irundha nalla irukkadhu...nee elachcha nalla irukkadhu, which translates into "I won't look good if I put on weight...but you won't look good if you have reduced weight" evoked a lot of laughter among audiences.

Prabhu's line, "Enna kodumai Saravanan idhu?", which means "What atrocity is this, Saravanan?" became popular. It is usually used to express irony or surprise. The line was often parodied by actor Premgi Amaren, who altered it slightly to "Enna Kodumai, Sir Idhu?" and used it in all of his featured films, subsequently becoming the actor's catchphrase. Prabhu said in an interview with Malathi Rangarajan of The Hindu that:

Parodies 
Chandramukhi was parodied in various films. In a comedy scene from Englishkaran (2005), Theeppori Thirumugam (Vadivelu) invents an idea to frighten Thamizharasu (Sathyaraj) but the ruse backfires on him as he witnesses Thamizharasu in a garb similar to that of Chandramukhi's. In a scene from Thalaimagan (2006), Erimalai (Vadivelu), after entering an old abandoned bungalow, gets frightened when he hears the "Lakka Lakka" sound, and says Yaaro Telugula Koopuddrangga! ( "Someone is calling in Telugu!"). In Vallavan (2006), Vallavan (Silambarasan) is seen singing "Konja Neram" to Swapna (Nayanthara). In Sivaji (2007), Thamizhselvi (Shriya Saran) would be seen dancing for the song "Raa Raa", Sivaji (Rajinikanth) and Arivu (Vivek) are seen uttering the last lines of the song. Livingston who appears as a police inspector, utters the sound "Lakka Lakka" which Rajinikanth makes in Chandramukhi. Rajinikanth and Nayanthara's characters act in a film titled Chandramukhi 2 in a scene from Kuselan (2008), which P. Vasu also directed. In Thamizh Padam (2010), Shiva (Shiva) would be seen imitating the film's introduction scene by stretching his leg when it is revealed that Siva has a split seam in his pants. Sundar C.'s role in the film Aranmanai (2014) was inspired by Rajinikanth's role in Chandramukhi. Chandramukhi was parodied in the Star Vijay comedy series Lollu Sabha, in an episode named Sappamookki.

Other versions 
Chandramukhi was later dubbed in Hindi, Telugu and Turkish with the same title and in Bhojpuri under the title Chandramukhi Ke Hunkaar. It is the first Tamil film to be dubbed into German. It was released in Germany under the title, Der Geisterjäger. Despite the release of Bhool Bhulaiyaa (2007), Chandramukhi's Hindi dubbed version was released on 29 February 2008 by Dilip Dhanwani, owner of the production house Royal Film Company. The Hindi version was released in collaboration with producer A. M. Rathnam.

Sequels 
A standalone sequel to Chandramukhi titled Nagavalli was made in Telugu. The sequel was also directed by P. Vasu, and was released on 16 December 2010. In April 2020, a Tamil sequel Chandramukhi 2 to be produced by Sun Pictures was announced, but taken over by Lyca Productions by June 2022. Vasu will return as director while confirmed cast members include Kangana Ranaut, Raghava Lawrence and Vadivelu. Principal photography began in mid-July 2022.

See also 
 Muni (film series)
 Aranmanai (film series)
 List of ghost films

Notes

References

Sources

External links 

 Official website
 

2000s ghost films
2000s supernatural horror films
2000s Tamil-language films
2005 comedy horror films
2005 films
Films about dissociative identity disorder
Films about exorcism
Films about telekinesis
Films directed by P. Vasu
Films scored by Vidyasagar
Films set in ancient India
Films set in Andhra Pradesh
Films shot in Hyderabad, India
Films shot in Karnataka
Films shot in Kochi
Films shot in Turkey
Indian comedy horror films
Indian ghost films
Indian horror film remakes
Indian nonlinear narrative films
Indian supernatural horror films
Religious horror films
Tamil remakes of Kannada films
Tamil remakes of Malayalam films